The 2012 European Cup Winter Throwing was held on 17 and 18 March at the Stadion Topolica in Bar, Montenegro. It was the twelfth edition of the athletics competition for throwing events and was jointly organised by the European Athletic Association and the Athletic Federation of Montenegro. The competition featured men's and women's contests in shot put, discus throw, javelin throw and hammer throw. In addition to the senior competitions, there were also under-23 events for younger athletes. A total of 294 athletes from 39 European countries entered the competition.

On the first day of the competition, Nadzeya Ostapchuk produced a throw of 20.29 m to win the shot put, while Martina Ratej took the women's javelin title. Dutchman Erik Cadée won the men's discus and Kirill Ikonnikov took the hammer title for Russia. In the men's under-23 discus event, home athlete Danijel Furtula threw a Montenegrin record to win the gold. The highlights of the second day were Nadine Müller's personal best of 68.89 m to win the women's discus (the best performance in the world in eight years) and Marco Fortes won the men's shot put in a Portuguese record and world-leading throw if 21.02 m. Turkish thrower Fatih Avan won the men's javelin and Zalina Marghieva broke the Moldovan record to beat Tatyana Lysenko to the women's hammer throw title.

Five national records were broken at the event. The non-medallists who achieved this feat were: Kateřina Šafránková (fourth in the women's hammer with 71.16 m), Danijel Furtula (17.10 m in the men's under-23 shot put), and Tiago Aperta (fourth in the men's under-23 javelin with 75.55 m). In the team rankings, Russia claimed both the senior titles while Ukraine won both the under-23 sections.

Medal summary

Senior

Under-23

References

Results
Bar  MNE  17 - 18 March  Throws. Tilastopaja. Retrieved on 2012-03-29.

External links
Official website
Articles at European Athletics

European Throwing Cup
European Cup Winter Throwing
Athletics in Montenegro
Sport in Bar, Montenegro
2012 in European sport